Rochester Theological College (1959–1970) was an Anglican theological college for the Diocese of Rochester in Kent, England. It focused on the provision of theological education for mature non-graduates.

History
The college was founded by the Bishop of Rochester, the Rt Rev Christopher Chavasse. The college closed in 1970, by which point 182 men had been trained for ordination.

From 1960 the college occupied the former Deanery. After closure in 1970 it became the sixth form centre for the King's School, Rochester.

The college's archives are held at the Medway Archives Centre.

Wardens
Robert Stannard, 1959-60 (as Dean of Rochester).
Stuart Blanch, 1960–66, later Bishop of Liverpool and Archbishop of York
Stanley Allen, 1966-70

Notable alumni
Ted Francis, Archdeacon of Bromley 1979–94.

References

Anglican seminaries and theological colleges
Former theological colleges in England
Religious organizations established in 1959
Educational institutions established in 1970
1970 disestablishments